Stuart Bell (born 21 March 1975) is a British figure skater who competed in men's singles. He placed 22nd at the 1994 World Junior Championships in Colorado Springs, Colorado. He won the bronze medal at the British Figure Skating Championships in 1994, 1998 and 2003.

After his competitive career ended, he became a figure skating coach.

References

External links
Our Instructors: Stuart Bell

1975 births
British male single skaters
Living people